Mills & Boon Monographs and Technical Library are short works on advanced technical engineering subjects published in the early 1970s by Mills & Boon, a British publisher better known for its romances.

The monographs are in series, for example: Mechanics Engineering Monographs, Mechanics Engineering Library and Electrical Engineering Monographs.

The library was the idea of Dr J. Gordon Cook, and consists of "concise up to date authoritative information" on new fields or fields where progress was being made.  The authors were acknowledged experts in their fields.

List of monographs
Key: TL = Technical library, CE = Chemical engineering, ME = Mechanical engineering

References

Series of books